Choe Ryong-su was a North Korean politician. He was a member of the Workers' Party of Korea. Between July 2003 and July 2004 he served as Ministry of People's Security when he was replaced by Ju Sang-song.

References

Members of the Supreme People's Assembly
Workers' Party of Korea politicians
Government ministers of North Korea